Dmitrii Fedotoff-White (1889–1950) was an Imperial Russian Navy officer from Saint Petersburg. He fought for the White forces during the Russian Civil War and wrote a book about his experiences entitled "Survival - Through War and Revolution in Russia" (1939).  He also fought for the British and later escaped Russia in 1921.

Writings

Books 
 Survival Through War And Revolution In Russia. Philadelphia. University of Pennsylvania press. 1939.
 The Growth of the Red Army. Princeton University Press. 1944.
 Portuguese trans.: O exército vermelho. Rio de Janeiro. 1945.

Articles 
 Soviet Philosophy of War. Political Science Quarterly, Vol. 51, No. 3 (Sep., 1936), pp. 321–353.
 The Russian Navy in Trieste. During the Wars of the Revolution and the Empire. American Slavic and East European Review, Vol. 6, No. 3/4 (Dec., 1947), pp. 25–41
 An Aristocrat at Stalin's Court. American Slavic and East European Review, Vol. 9, No. 3 (Oct., 1950), pp. 207–217.
 A Russian Sketches Philadelphia, 1811–1813. The Pennsylvania Magazine of History and Biography, Vol. 75, No. 1 (Jan., 1951), pp. 3–24

External links
 Columbia University collection of private papers of Fedotoff-White

1889 births
1950 deaths
20th-century American historians
American male non-fiction writers
20th-century American male writers